Damat (from  (dâmâd) "bridegroom") was an official Ottoman title describing men that entered the imperial House of Osman by means of marriage, literally becoming the bridegroom to the Ottoman sultan and the dynasty. In almost all cases, this occurred when a man married an Ottoman princess.

Among others, the following people were damats to the Ottoman dynasty:

 Hersekzade Ahmed Pasha, Grand Vizier (1497–98, 1503–06, 1511, 1512–14, 1515–16)
 Çorlulu Damat Ali Pasha, Grand Vizier (1706–10)
 Silahdar Damat Ali Pasha, Grand Vizier (1713–16)
 Bayram Pasha, Grand Vizier (1637–38)
 Kara Davud Pasha, Grand Vizier (1622)
 Koca Davud Pasha, Grand Vizier (1482–97)
 Ebubekir Pasha, Kapudan Pasha (1732–33, 1750–51)
 Enver Pasha, Minister of War (1913–18)
 Damat Ferid Pasha, Grand Vizier (1919, 1920)
 Damat Halil Pasha, Grand Vizier (1616–19, 1626–28)
 Damat Hasan Pasha, Grand Vizier (1703–04)
 Yemişçi Hasan Pasha, Grand Vizier (1601–03)
 Küçük Hüseyin Pasha, Kapudan Pasha (1792–1803)
 Damat Ibrahim Pasha, Grand Vizier (1596, 1596–97, 1599–1601)
 Nevşehirli Damat Ibrahim Pasha, Grand Vizier (1718–30)
 Lütfi Pasha, Grand Vizier (1539–41)
 Ibşir Mustafa Pasha, Grand Vizier (1654–55)
 Kara Mustafa Pasha, governor of Egypt (1623, 1624–26)
 Damat Mehmed Ali Pasha, Grand Vizier (1852–53)
 Öküz Mehmed Pasha, Grand Vizier (1614–16, 1619)
 Gümülcineli Damat Nasuh Pasha, Grand Vizier (1611–14)
 Ahmed Nami Bey, the 5th Prime Minister of Syria and 2nd President of Syria (1926–28), and a lecturer of History and Politics
 Köprülü Numan Pasha, Grand Vizier (1710)
 Koca Ragıp Pasha, Grand Vizier (1757–63)
 Rüstem Pasha, Grand Vizier (1544–53, 1555–61)
 Ahmad Beg
 Ughurlu Muhammad

See also
Yabancı Damat, a popular Turkish television series
Cici Damat, the Turkish title of the French film Le gendarme se marie

Ottoman titles
Turkish words and phrases